Kelly Michael Armstrong (born October 8, 1976) is an American lawyer and politician serving as the U.S. representative for North Dakota's at-large congressional district since 2019. A member of the Republican Party, he served as the North Dakota state senator from the 36th district from 2012 to 2018 and chair of the North Dakota Republican Party from 2015 until 2018.

Early life and education
Armstrong graduated from Dickinson High School in 1995. He earned a Bachelor of Arts in psychology from the University of North Dakota in 2001 and a Juris Doctor from the University of North Dakota School of Law in 2003, after spending his first year of law school at the College of William & Mary. He is a member of the Sigma Chi fraternity.

Career
Armstrong was a partner at Reichert Armstrong, with offices in Grand Forks and Dickinson, before his Congressional election. He served as the North Dakota State Senator from the 36th district from 2013 to 2018 and chaired the North Dakota Republican Party from 2015 to 2018.

U.S. House of Representatives

Elections

2018 

In February 2018, Armstrong announced his candidacy for the United States House of Representatives. He was endorsed by the North Dakota Republican Party at its state party convention in April 2018. Armstrong won the November 6 election with 60.2% of the vote. He resigned his seat in the North Dakota Legislature on November 7 and took office in Congress in January 2019, replacing Kevin Cramer, who was elected to the United States Senate.

2020 

Armstrong ran for reelection and won on November 3, with 68.96% of the vote.

2022 

Armstrong won reelection on November 8, receiving 62.2% of the vote.

Tenure 
Armstrong was one of a coalition of seven Republicans who did not support their colleagues' efforts to challenge the results of the 2020 presidential election on January 6, 2021. These seven signed a letter that, while giving credence to election fraud allegations made by President Donald Trump, said Congress did not have the authority to influence the election's outcome.

On July 19, 2022, Armstrong and 46 other Republican representatives voted for the Respect for Marriage Act, which would codify the right to same-sex marriage in federal law.

In 2022, Armstrong was one of 39 Republicans to vote for the Merger Filing Fee Modernization Act of 2022, an antitrust package that would crack down on corporations for anti-competitive behavior.

Committee assignments 
Committee on the Judiciary
Subcommittee on Constitution, Civil Rights, and Civil Liberties
Subcommittee on Immigration and Citizenship
Subcommittee on Antitrust, Commercial, and Administrative Law
Committee on Oversight and Reform
Subcommittee on Environment

Caucus memberships 
 Republican Governance Group
Friends of Norway Caucus (co-chair)
Fire Services Caucus
Air Force Caucus
Coal Caucus
Rural Broadband Caucus
Northern Border Caucus
National Guard and Reserve Caucus
Caucus on Youth Sports
Sportsmen's Caucus
Republican Study Committee

Electoral history

References

External links 

 Congressman Kelly Armstrong official U.S. House website
Kelly Armstrong for Congress official campaign site
 

Profile at the North Dakota Legislature

|-

|-

|-

1976 births
Living people
Republican Party members of the United States House of Representatives from North Dakota
Republican Party North Dakota state senators
State political party chairs of North Dakota
21st-century American politicians
North Dakota lawyers
21st-century American lawyers
University of North Dakota alumni
People from Dickinson, North Dakota